Handan is a prefecture-level city in Hebei, China.

Handan may also refer to:

Handan (name), Turkish name
Handan Sultan - concubine of Ottoman Sultan Mehmed III, mother and Valide Sultan of Ahmed I. 
Handan County, in Handan, Hebei, China
Chinese frigate Handan (579), a Type 054A frigate of the People's Liberation Army Navy commissioned in 2018